Bùi Tiến Dụng (born 23 November 1998) is a Vietnamese footballer of Mường ethnicity who plays as a central midfielder for V.League 1 club Công An Hà Nội.

Honours
Than Quảng Ninh 
Vietnamese National Cup: 2016
Vietnamese Super Cup: 2016
Vietnam U23
AFC U-23 Championship Runners-up  2018

Trivia 

 He is younger brother of goalkeeper Bùi Tiến Dũng.

External links

References 

1998 births
Living people
Vietnamese footballers
Association football midfielders
V.League 1 players
Than Quang Ninh FC players
People from Thanh Hóa province
Competitors at the 2019 Southeast Asian Games
Southeast Asian Games medalists in football
Southeast Asian Games gold medalists for Vietnam
21st-century Vietnamese people